The 1902 Tennessee gubernatorial election was held on November 4, 1902. Democratic nominee James B. Frazier defeated Republican nominee Henry Tyler Campbell with 61.77% of the vote.

Incumbent Democratic Governor Benton McMillin did not seek re-election.

Nominations
Nominations were made by party conventions.

Democratic nomination
The Democratic convention was held on May 29 at Nashville.

Candidate
James B. Frazier, attorney and judge, nominated by acclamation

Republican nomination
The Republican convention was held on June 18 at Nashville.

Candidate
Henry Tyler Campbell, judge

General election

Candidates
Henry Tyler Campbell, Republican
R. S. Cheves, Prohibition
James B. Frazier, Democratic

Results

References

Bibliography
 
 

1902
Tennessee
Gubernatorial
November 1902 events